The 2013 African Women's Youth Handball Championship was the 8th edition of the African Women's Youth Handball Championship. The event, organized by the African Handball Confederation, under the supervision of the International Handball Federation, took place in the Republic of the Congo, in one host city, Oyo, from August 24 to 30. Seven teams participated on the tournament. Angola, the defending champion, retained its title, by beating Tunisia 29-18 in the final.

The tournament also served as the qualification for the 2014 Women's Youth World Handball Championship, in Macedonia.

Draw

Preliminary round
The seven teams were divided into two groups. Top two teams from each group advanced to the semi-finals while the last three played for the 5th to 7th places.

Group A

Group B

Placement round 5–7

Bracket

5th to 7th place matches

Final round

Bracket

Semifinals

Bronze medal match

Final

Final ranking

Awards

See also
 2012 African Women's Handball Championship
 2013 African Women's Junior Handball Championship

References

External links
 Tournament page on the African Handball Confederation official website

African Women's Youth Handball Championship
2013 in African handball
2013 in the Republic of the Congo sport
International sports competitions hosted by the Republic of the Congo
Youth
Women's handball in the Republic of the Congo